Kissoondath Magram is a West Indian cricketer. He made his first-class debut on 16 January 2020, for Trinidad and Tobago in the 2019–20 West Indies Championship. In August 2020, he was added to the Guyana Amazon Warriors' squad for the 2020 Caribbean Premier League (CPL). He made his Twenty20 debut on 1 September 2020, for the Guyana Amazon Warriors in the 2020 CPL.

References

External links
 

Year of birth missing (living people)
Living people
Guyana Amazon Warriors cricketers
Trinidad and Tobago cricketers
Place of birth missing (living people)